Frederic Erskine Bronson,  (December 4, 1886 – April 1953) was a leading Ottawa businessman and chairman of the Federal District Commission, forerunner of the National Capital Commission, a government body empowered with planning Canada's National Capital Region of Ottawa-Hull and Gatineau. On August 23, 1951 he was sworn into the Queen's Privy Council for Canada in recognition of his public service.

References

Members of the King's Privy Council for Canada
1886 births
1953 deaths
Businesspeople from Ottawa
Politicians from Ottawa
National Capital Commission